The 2019–20 season was MOL Vidi FC's 52nd competitive season, 21st consecutive season in the OTP Bank Liga and 79th year in existence as a football club.

First team squad

Transfers

Summer

In:

Out:

Source:

Winter

In:

Out:

Source:

Competitions

Overview

Nemzeti Bajnokság I

League table

Results summary

Results by round

Matches

Hungarian Cup

UEFA Europa League

First qualifying round

Second qualifying round

Statistics

Appearances and goals
Last updated on 27 June 2020.

|-
|colspan="14"|Youth players:

|-
|colspan="14"|Players no longer at the club:

|}

Top scorers
Includes all competitive matches. The list is sorted by shirt number when total goals are equal.
Last updated on 27 June 2020

Disciplinary record
Includes all competitive matches. Players with 1 card or more included only.

Last updated on 27 June 2020

Overall
{|class="wikitable"
|-
|Games played || 46 (33 OTP Bank Liga, 4 UEFA Europa League and 9 Hungarian Cup)
|-
|Games won || 25 (18 OTP Bank Liga, 2 UEFA Europa League and 5 Hungarian Cup)
|-
|Games drawn || 13 (9 OTP Bank Liga, 1 UEFA Europa League and 3 Hungarian Cup)
|-
|Games lost || 8 (6 OTP Bank Liga, 1 UEFA Europa League and 1 Hungarian Cup)
|-
|Goals scored || 79
|-
|Goals conceded || 39
|-
|Goal difference || +40
|-
|Yellow cards || 96
|-
|Red cards || 2
|-
|rowspan="1"|Worst discipline ||  Boban Nikolov (8 , 0 )
|-
|rowspan="1"|Best result || 5–0 (H) v Zalaegerszeg - Hungarian Cup - 11-3-2020
|-
|rowspan="5"|Worst result || 0–2 (A) v Vaduz - UEFA Europa League - 1-8-2019
|-
| 0–2 (H) v Újpest - Nemzeti Bajnokság I - 28-9-2019
|-
| 1–3 (H) v Puskás Akadémia - Nemzeti Bajnokság I - 23-11-2019
|-
| 0–2 (H) v Paks - Nemzeti Bajnokság I - 7-12-2019
|-
| 0–2 (A) v Zalaegerszeg - Hungarian Cup - 4-3-2020
|-
|rowspan="1"|Most appearances ||  Ivan Petryak (45 appearances)
|-
|rowspan="1"|Top scorer ||  Armin Hodžić (15 goals)
|-
|Points || 88/136 (64.7%)
|-

Attendances

List of the home matches:

References

External links
 Official Website
 UEFA
 fixtures and results

Fehérvár FC seasons
Hungarian football clubs 2019–20 season